In Hinduism, Anala ("fire" in Sanskrit) is one of the Vasus, gods of the material world. He is equated with Agni, and is essentially the name usually used for Agni when listed among the Vasus.

Hindu gods